Maredudd ab Owain (died ) was a 10th-century king in Wales of the High Middle Ages. A member of the House of Dinefwr, his patrimony was the kingdom of Deheubarth comprising the southern realms of Dyfed, Ceredigion, and Brycheiniog. Upon the death of his father King Owain around AD 988, he also inherited the kingdoms of Gwynedd and Powys, which he had conquered for his father. He was counted among the Kings of the Britons by the Chronicle of the Princes.

Maredudd was the younger son of King Owain of Deheubarth and the grandson of King Hywel the Good. Owain had inherited the kingdom through the early death of his brothers and Maredudd, too, came to the throne through the death of his elder brother Einion around 984. Around 986, Maredudd captured Gwynedd from its king Cadwallon ab Ieuaf. He may have controlled all Wales apart from Gwent and Morgannwg.

Maredudd is recorded as raiding Mercian settlements on the borders of Radnor and as paying a ransom of a silver penny a head to rescue some of his subjects who had been taken captive in Danish raids. Viking raids were a constant problem during Maredudd's reign. In 987, Godfrey Haroldson raided Anglesey, supposedly killing one thousand and carrying away another two thousand as captives; Maredudd was said to have then paid a huge ransom for the freedom of the hostages.

Following Maredudd's death around AD 999, the throne of Gwynedd was recovered for the line of Idwal Foel by Cynan ap Hywel. The throne of Deheubarth went to a man named Rhain who was accepted as Maredudd's son by its people but whoafter the kingdom's conquest by Llywelyn ap Seisyllwas recorded by most Welsh histories as an Irish pretender and usurper. The kingdom was later restored to Maredudd's family, but through Hywel, the grandson of his brother Einion.

References

Sources 

 

|-

990s deaths
Year of birth unknown
Year of death uncertain
10th-century Welsh monarchs
House of Dinefwr
Monarchs of Deheubarth
Monarchs of Gwynedd
Monarchs of Powys